Vincent John Fuller (June 21, 1931 – July 26, 2006) was an American criminal defence lawyer, whose high-profile client's included  John Hinckley Jr., Jimmy Hoffa and Mike Tyson.

Biography
Born in Ossining, New York, Fuller graduated from Williams College in 1952, then served two years as an officer in the United States Navy. He graduated from Georgetown Law School in 1956 and was the second lawyer hired by Edward Bennett Williams at Williams & Connolly in 1967.

He successfully defended boxer Don King on income tax evasion charges, but he lost the 1989 case defending financier Michael Milken on charges of insider trading.

He died of lung cancer and pulmonary obstructive disease in July 2006.

References

1931 births
2006 deaths
20th-century American lawyers
Criminal defense lawyers
Deaths from lung cancer
Williams College alumni
People from Ossining, New York